Eight Minutes to Midnight: A Portrait of Dr. Helen Caldicott is a 1981 American documentary film about anti-nuclear weapons activist Helen Caldicott, directed by Mary Benjamin. It was nominated for an Academy Award for Best Documentary Feature.

See also
If You Love This Planet, a 1982 short documentary about Caldicott as well as a radio program of the same name

References

External links

Eight Minutes to Midnight: A Portrait of Dr. Helen Caldicott at Direct Cinema

1981 films
1981 documentary films
American documentary films
Documentary films about women
Documentary films about nuclear war and weapons
Films about activists
1980s English-language films
1980s American films